Marc T. J. Johnson  is a professor of biology at the University of Toronto Mississauga. He is the Canada Research Chair for Urban Environmental Science, and the Director of the Centre for Urban Environments.

Education 
Johnson obtained his Ph.D. in botany from the University of Toronto in 2007, after which he conducted an Natural Sciences and Engineering Research Council (NSERC) Postdoctoral Fellowship at Duke University.

Research 
Johnson's research uses concepts and methods from genetics, ecology, evolution and chemistry to look at plants and plant-animal interactions and adaptations to urban environments. His recent work under the Global Urban Evolution Project looked at white clover populations from 160 cities to investigate responses to urban environmental change. Dr. Johnson has over 100 scientific publications.

Awards 
 2020 NSERC Steacie Fellowship
 2012 Connaught Early Researcher Award – University of Toronto
 2012 Early Career Award - Canadian Society of Ecology Evolutionary Biology
 2012 Early Researcher Award - Ontario Ministry of Research and Innovation
 2010 Young Investigator Prize – American Society of Naturalists
 2007 Governor General's Gold Medal - University of Toronto
 2007 Postdoctoral Fellowship – NSERC Canada
 2005 Canadian Graduate Scholarship - NSERC Canada
 2004 Ontario Graduate scholarship
 2002 Post-graduate Scholarship A - NSERC Canada
 1998 Undergraduate Student Research Undergraduate Award – NSERC Canada

References 

Academic staff of the University of Toronto Mississauga
Year of birth missing (living people)
Living people
Canada Research Chairs
University of Toronto alumni
21st-century Canadian biologists